Elko is an unincorporated community in Putnam County, in the U.S. state of Missouri.

History
Elko was originally called Garfield Springs, and under the latter name was platted in 1833. A post office called Elko was established in 1885, and remained in operation until 1908.

References

Unincorporated communities in Putnam County, Missouri
Unincorporated communities in Missouri